Colegio Antilen is a private school in Rengo, in the Cachapoal Province of Chile which provides pre-basic, basic and secondary education.

References

External links
 

Educational institutions with year of establishment missing
Secondary schools in Chile
Schools in Cachapoal Province
1995 establishments in Chile
Educational institutions established in 1995